Hol is a municipality in Viken county, Norway.

Administrative history
The area of Hol was separated from the municipality Ål in 1877 to become a separate municipality. In 1937 a part of neighboring Uvdal with 220 inhabitants moved to Hol municipality. The area was transferred from Uvdal to Hol in 1944. Uvdal was reunited with Nore to form the new municipality of Nore og Uvdal.

General information

Name
The municipality (originally the parish) is named after the old Hol farm, since the first church was built here. The name is identical with the word , which means 'round (and isolated) hill'.

Villages and hamlets in Hol municipality 

 Dagali 
 Geilo
 Hagafoss 
 Hol (village)
 Hovet
 Kvisla
 Myrland
 Strønde
 Sudndalen
 Vedalen

Geography
Hol is bordered to the north by Lærdal, to the north and east by Ål, to the south by Nore og Uvdal, and to the west by Eidfjord, Ulvik and Aurland. Hol is a mountainous area, where over 90% of the area is at an altitude exceeding 900 meters above sea level. The Hallingskarvet mountain range is the highest point in the municipality, at 1933 meters above sea level. The Usta or Usteåne River flows northeast from Lake Ustevatn traveling down the Ustedalen valley. The Hallingdalselva River is formed by the confluence of the Usta River and the Holselva River from Lake Strandavatnet.

Lakes
Ustevatn – in the municipality of Hol
Nygardsvatnet – in the municipality of Hol
Strandavatnet  –  in the municipality of Hol
Ørteren –  in the municipality of Hol
Nyhellervatnet  – on the border between Hol and Aurland, Vestland county
Pålsbufjorden – in the municipalities of Hol and Nore og Uvdal
Øvre Hein  – in the municipalities of Hol and Nore og Uvdal
Djupsvatnet – in the municipalities of Hol and Ål
Flakavatnet  – in the municipalities of Hol and Ulvik, Hordaland county

Mountains
Galdene
Haldalshøgdi
Julsennosi
Kyrkjedørsnuten
Miljonuten

Coat-of-arms
The coat-of-arms of Hol is from modern times; the arms were granted on 5 July 1991. They show three silver anvils on a blue background and were designed by Trond Andersson.  The three anvils are stacked one above the other, with the top one being largest and the bottom one smallest. The anvil was chosen to symbolize the former smithies in the municipality, which were famous for the production of axes, blades, and knives. Iron mining was already practiced in the area in the Viking Age.

(See also coat-of-arms of Trøgstad)

Hol Old Church
Hol Old Church is presumed to date from the 13th century, but the exact dating is unknown. The church is the oldest parish in Hol and is first mentioned in a letter from 1328 as a small stave church with covered side porches. The church has been expanded several times, in the 16th century, in 1697 and in 1798–99. It was rebuilt in 1888 and 1938. It is believed that the floor of the church was made using columns from the old stave church. The pulpit and baptismal font are from the Renaissance period (1697) and the altarpiece from 1703. The pulpit is placed above the altar.

Notable residents

 Knut Henriksen Dybsjord (1809–1866), mayor and temperance movement activist 
Pål Olson Grøt (1813–1906), Rosemåling painter
 Olav Sletto (1886–1963), novelist and educator
 Knut Bry (born 1946 in Hovet), fine-art photographer and film director
 Terje Isungset (born 1964), musician, percussionist and composer

Sport 
 Margit Hvammen (1932 in Geilo – 2010) alpine skier
 Aud Hvammen (born 1943 in Geilo), alpine skier
 Anne Brusletto (born 1951 in Geilo), alpine skier
 Martin Hole (born 1959), former cross country runner
 Ådne Søndrål (born 1971), former speed skater and gold medallist at the 1998 Winter Olympics
 Håvard Bøkko  (born 1987 in Hovet), speed skater
 Roger S. Kleivdal (born 1988), snowboarder
 Christoffer Fagerli Rukke (born 1988), speed skater
 Hege Bøkko (born 1991 in Hovet), speed skater
 Vetle Sjåstad Christiansen (born 1992 in Geilo), biathlete
 Tiril Sjåstad Christiansen (born 1995 in Geilo), freestyle skier

Gallery

Attractions
Hallingskarvet National Park – national park in the municipalities of Hol (Buskerud), Ulvik (Hordaland) and Aurland (Sogn og Fjordane)
Hol Bygdemuseum – located along the road from Ål to Geilo in the small village of Hagafoss. The museum is built as an old farm with buildings of the local type.
Dagali Museum – museum with ten buildings located in the middle of Dagali, on the edge of Hardangervidda. The buildings came from Dagali, Skurdalen, Tunhovd, and Uvdal; the oldest dates to the 18th century.
 Dagali Skisenter – alpine resort in Dagali, also offering sled-racing, with one of Norway's longest sled-racing hills.
Dr Holms Hotel – resort hotel in the ski resort town of Geilo

Sister cities
The following cities are twinned with Hol:
  – Halinga Parish, Pärnu County, Estonia
  – Mäntyharju, Itä-Suomi, Finland
  – Säffle, Värmland County, Sweden

See also
1980 Winter Paralympics
Blåbergi
Ljøtebotnberget

External links

Municipal fact sheet from Statistics Norway

Dagali Opplevelser – offering a great deal of activities in and around Dagali 
Dagali Skisenter – The alpine resort in Dagali 
Map hiking and DNT cabins

References

 
Hallingdal
Municipalities of Buskerud
Municipalities of Viken (county)